Aqueity was the name of a number of ships operated by F T Everard, including:

 
 
 

Ship names